WDEO is a radio station broadcasting on 990 kilohertz in Ypsilanti, Michigan.  Broadcasting Catholic programming, WDEO is operated by Ave Maria Radio.

Some programming is locally produced, and some is simulcast from EWTN's "Global Catholic Radio" shortwave network.

History
WDEO began operations in 1962 as WYNZ, a 250-watt daytimer on 1520 AM with a country format, which changed to Top 40 in 1964 and then religious programming in 1968. Two young DJs who would go on to long careers in radio started at WYNZ: 14-year-old Jim Kerr, who got on the air by selling airtime to local merchants; and John Huzar, a teenaged friend who took over Kerr's show one week. Kerr later spent over twenty years in New York as WPLJ's morning man (1974–96), while Huzar -- better known as Jim Harper -- became a Detroit radio legend, retiring from WMGC-FM at the end of 2011. (Harper returned to radio in 2017, doing a weekly show on WLXT in Petoskey, Michigan.)

In 1974, the station changed its calls to WYFC with the format remaining Christian-based. By the early 1980s, WYFC had become one of the first stations in the area to feature the emerging field of what would become known as contemporary Christian music.  In late 1986, the station moved to its current 990 AM frequency and became WWCM (known as simply "WCM" on the air). The format remained Contemporary Christian.  In the late 1990s, WWCM's daytime power increased to 9,200 watts, giving the station much better coverage of the metropolitan Detroit area.  WCM also broadcast in AM Stereo (which was dropped after the station changed format).

Former Domino's Pizza owner Tom Monaghan purchased WWCM in 1999 and changed it to WDEO, using the same calls and Catholic format formerly heard on AM 1290 in Saline (now WLBY). The station's studios were also moved from their longtime location on Cross Street in Ypsilanti into the Domino's Farms complex near Ann Arbor.

Ave Maria Radio
In addition to WDEO, Ave Maria Radio is heard on WMAX in Bay City. EWTN also carries some programming produced by Ave Maria Radio including Catholic Connection with Teresa Tomeo and Kresta in the Afternoon with Al Kresta.

See also
Media in Detroit

References

External links
FCC History Cards for WDEO

DEO
Catholic radio stations
Radio stations established in 1962
1962 establishments in Michigan